Josh Griffiths (born 3 November 1993) is a Welsh marathon runner. He finished 13th at the 2017 London Marathon, and was the first Briton to finish, in a time of 2:14:49. His unexpected performance earned him a place at the 2017 World Championships.

Running career
Griffiths's debut marathon was at the London Marathon on 23 April 2017. Representing his club, Swansea Harriers, he started the race alongside other club runners, behind the elite athletes. He finished the race in 2:14:49 in thirteenth place overall, the first of the British runners. His performance gained him qualification to represent Great Britain at the World Championships in London in 2017. The marathon was held on 6 August, and Griffiths completed the race in a time of 2:20.06 to finish in 39th place.

In 2021 Griffiths finished 8th in the London Marathon on 3 October.

He is a self-coached athlete.

Personal life
Griffiths, aged 23 at the time of the 2017 London Marathon, lives in his family's home in rural West Wales. He studied at Cardiff Metropolitan University, and graduated with a master's degree in sports coaching in July 2017.

References

1993 births
Athletes (track and field) at the 2018 Commonwealth Games
British male marathon runners
Living people
Commonwealth Games competitors for Wales
Swansea Harriers Athletics Club
Welsh male long-distance runners